Postumius Suagrus or Suagrius (fl. 3rd century AD) was a Roman senator.

Biography
Postumius Suagrus was a member of the third century gens Postumii, which was not descended from the Republican family of the same name. He may have served as suffect consul sometime prior to AD 275. In that year, he was appointed Praefectus urbi of Rome.

Sources
 Martindale, J. R.; Jones, A. H. M, The Prosopography of the Later Roman Empire, Vol. I AD 260–395, Cambridge University Press (1971)
 Mennen, Inge, Power and Status in the Roman Empire, AD 193-284 (2011)

References

3rd-century Romans
Imperial Roman consuls
Urban prefects of Rome
Year of birth unknown
Year of death unknown